Caill Tomair (Middle Irish 'Thor's Grove') was a sacred grove dedicated to the North Germanic god Thor. Located near the Norse-Gaelic city of Dublin, the grove was destroyed by forces led by Brian Boru early in the year 1000 AD.

According to scholar Poul Holm, the grove was likely targeted due to its role among the local population:
[Caill Tomair] must have been a sacred wood and was deliberately cut down by Brian Boru of Munster when he conquered the town at Christmas in the year 1000. The cutting was a considerable undertaking and may have been conducted to clear an open passage to the town as much as to undercut a pagan rite which by then must have been rapidly declining.

See also
 Donar's Oak, an oak dedicated to Thor cut down by Anglo-Saxon Missionary Saint Boniface in the 8th century

Notes

References

 Holm, Poul. 2000. "Viking Dublin and the City-State Concept. Parameters and Significance of the Hiberno-Norse Settlement" in Hansen, Mogens Herman. A Comparative Study of Thirty City-state Cultures, pp. 251–262. The Royal Danish Academy of Science and Letters. 

Trees in Germanic paganism
Iconoclasm
Sacred groves
Destruction of religious buildings and structures
Persecution of Pagans
Viking Age in Ireland